Fontaine-l’Étalon is a commune in the Pas-de-Calais department in the Hauts-de-France region of France.

Geography

Population

Places of interest
 The church of St. Fermin, dating from the sixteenth century.
 The Commonwealth War Graves Commission cemetery.
 Traces of an old chateau.
 An old mill.

See also
Communes of the Pas-de-Calais department

References

External links

 The CWGC cemetery in the churchyard

Fontaineletalon